Tifty may refer to:

Tifty, character in The Twelve (novel)
Tifty, Aberdeenshire, Scotland